Persicaria glabra is a species of flowering plant native to North America and Eurasia.

Description
It is similar in appearance to P. longiseta and P. lapathifolia. The plant is a medium-sized annual herb with red, swollen joints and lanceolate leaves. The inflorescence is a dense raceme of small pink or white flowers, the fruit a flattened black nut.

References

Flora of North America
Perennial plants
glabra